Jong Shyn Shipbuilding Company (JSSC) is a Taiwanese shipbuilder based in Kaohsiung, Taiwan. It is the largest private shipbuilder in Taiwan.

History 
Jong Shyn Shipbuilding Company was founded in 1973. By 2009 they had built more than 400 ships. In 2009 JSSC received orders for more than twenty ships between 500-tons and 2,000-tons from the Coast Guard Administration (Taiwan) (CGA). In 2015 JSSC launched two 3,000-ton patrol ships for the CGA, the Yilan (CG 128) and Kaohsiung (CG 129). JSSC is participating in the development of a Taiwanese domestic AUV.

They have delivered Taiwan's first locally designed and built drilling vessel. The Polaris Australis was delivered to Dragon Prince Hydro-Survey Enterprise Co and Dragon Prince in 2017. She has been chartered by Copenhagen Infrastructure Partners to install underwater power cables for their offshore wind farms.

In 2019 Jong Shyn began the construction on the first of twelve 600-ton catamaran patrol vessels ordered by the Coast Guard Administration. Known as the Anping-class offshore patrol vessel the patrol vessels are based on the 567-ton Tuo Chiang-class corvette. The contract to build the 12 600-ton patrol vessels and 52 35-ton patrol vessels for the CGA was worth NTD 17b (USD ~550m). The first 600-ton patrol vessel and first two 35-ton patrol vessels were launched in December 2019.

Jade Yachts 

Jade Yachts is a JSSC subsidiary founded in 2004 to build steel and aluminum yachts for the domestic and international market.

See also
 List of companies of Taiwan
 Maritime industries of Taiwan
 Defense industry of Taiwan
 CSBC Corporation, Taiwan
 Lungteh Shipbuilding
 Coast Guard Administration (Taiwan)

References 

Manufacturing companies based in Kaohsiung
Shipbuilding companies of Taiwan
Defence companies of Taiwan
Taiwanese boat builders